"Let There Be Drums" is a 1961 instrumental composed by American drummer Sandy Nelson and guitarist Richard Podolor, who later became a renowned record producer.

Background
The piece is a guitar and drums duet and is an early example of surf music.

Chart performance
It was released as a Sandy Nelson single on Imperial Records X5775 and was a charted hit, reaching No.7 on the U.S. Billboard Hot 100 and No.9 on the U.S. Cash Box charts (weeks of 24 December and 16 December 1961), and No. 8 in Canada (weeks of 4 December and 11 December 1961).  Nelson's "Let There Be Drums" was an Australian No.1 single for a week (week of 20 January 1962) and peaked at No.3 on the U.K. singles chart during the weeks of 4–10 January and 18–24 January 1962, becoming the 50th best-selling single in the U.K. during the calendar year 1962.

Cover versions
The Incredible Bongo Band's rendition of this instrumental was the theme music for Atlantic Grand Prix Wrestling telecasts on the former ATV in Maritime Canada between the 1970s and the 1980s. The song had reached #66 in the Canadian RPM charts. It was also featured in "The Tenth Inning" of Ken Burns' Baseball.

References

Songs about drums
1961 songs
1961 singles
Imperial Records singles
Sandy Nelson songs
1960s instrumentals